In many popular versions of axiomatic set theory, the axiom schema of specification, also known as the axiom schema of separation, subset axiom scheme or axiom schema of restricted comprehension is an axiom schema.  Essentially, it says that any definable subclass of a set is a set.

Some mathematicians call it the axiom schema of comprehension, although others use that term for unrestricted comprehension, discussed below.

Because restricting comprehension avoided Russell's paradox, several mathematicians including Zermelo, Fraenkel, and Gödel considered it the most important axiom of set theory.

Statement 
One instance of the schema is included for each formula φ in the language of set theory with free variables among x, w1, ..., wn, A. So B does not occur free in φ. In the formal language of set theory, the axiom schema is:

or in words:
 Given any set A, there is a set B (a subset of A) such that, given any set x, x is a member of B if and only if x is a member of A and φ holds for x. 
Note that there is one axiom for every such predicate φ; thus, this is an axiom schema.

To understand this axiom schema, note that the set B must be a subset of A. Thus, what the axiom schema is really saying is that, given a set A and a predicate P, we can find a subset B of A whose members are precisely the members of A that satisfy P.  By the axiom of extensionality this set is unique.  We usually denote this set using set-builder notation as {C ∈ A : P(C)}. Thus the essence of the axiom is:
 Every subclass of a set that is defined by a predicate is itself a set.

The preceding form of separation was introduced in 1930 by Thoralf Skolem as a refinement of a previous form by Zermelo. The axiom schema of specification is characteristic of systems of axiomatic set theory related to the usual set theory ZFC, but does not usually appear in radically different systems of alternative set theory.  For example, New Foundations and positive set theory use different restrictions of the axiom of comprehension of naive set theory. The Alternative Set Theory of Vopenka makes a specific point of allowing proper subclasses of sets, called semisets.  Even in systems related to ZFC, this scheme is sometimes restricted to formulas with bounded quantifiers, as in Kripke–Platek set theory with urelements.

Relation to the axiom schema of replacement 
The axiom schema of separation can almost be derived from the axiom schema of replacement.

First, recall this axiom schema:

for any functional predicate F in one variable that doesn't use the symbols A, B, C or D.
Given a suitable predicate P for the axiom of specification, define the mapping F by F(D) = D if P(D) is true and F(D) = E if P(D) is false, where E is any member of A such that P(E) is true.
Then the set B guaranteed by the axiom of replacement is precisely the set B required for the axiom of specification. The only problem is if no such E exists.  But in this case, the set B required for the axiom of separation is the empty set, so the axiom of separation follows from the axiom of replacement together with the axiom of empty set.

For this reason, the axiom schema of specification is often left out of modern lists of the Zermelo–Fraenkel axioms. However, it's still important for historical considerations, and for comparison with alternative axiomatizations of set theory, as can be seen for example in the following sections.

Unrestricted comprehension 

The axiom schema of unrestricted comprehension reads:

that is:

This set  is again unique, and is usually denoted as 

This axiom schema was tacitly used in the early days of naive set theory, before a strict axiomatization was adopted. Unfortunately, it leads directly to Russell's paradox by taking  to be  (i.e., the property that set  is not a member of itself). Therefore, no useful axiomatization of set theory can use unrestricted comprehension. Passing from classical logic to intuitionistic logic does not help, as the proof of Russell's paradox is intuitionistically valid.

Accepting only the axiom schema of specification was the beginning of axiomatic set theory. Most of the other Zermelo–Fraenkel axioms (but not the axiom of extensionality, the axiom of regularity, or the axiom of choice) then became necessary to make up for some of what was lost by changing the axiom schema of comprehension to the axiom schema of specification – each of these axioms states that a certain set exists, and defines that set by giving a predicate for its members to satisfy, i.e. it is a special case of the axiom schema of comprehension.

It is also possible to prevent the schema from being inconsistent by restricting which formulae it can be applied to, such as only stratified formulae in New Foundations (see below) or only positive formulae (formulae with only conjunction, disjunction, quantification and atomic formulae) in positive set theory. Positive formulae, however, typically are unable to express certain things that most theories can; for instance, there is no complement or relative complement in positive set theory.

In NBG class theory 
In von Neumann–Bernays–Gödel set theory, a distinction is made between sets and classes. A class  is a set if and only if it belongs to some class . In this theory, there is a theorem schema that reads

that is,

provided that the quantifiers in the predicate  are restricted to sets.

This theorem schema is itself a restricted form of comprehension, which avoids Russell's paradox because of the requirement that  be a set. Then specification for sets themselves can be written as a single axiom

that is,

or even more simply

In this axiom, the predicate  is replaced by the class , which can be quantified over. Another simpler axiom which achieves the same effect is

that is,

In higher-order settings 
In a typed language where we can quantify over predicates, the axiom schema of specification becomes a simple axiom. This is much the same trick as was used in the NBG axioms of the previous section, where the predicate was replaced by a class that was then quantified over.

In second-order logic and higher-order logic with higher-order semantics, the axiom of specification is a logical validity and does not need to be explicitly included in a theory.

In Quine's New Foundations 
In the New Foundations approach to set theory pioneered by W. V. O. Quine, the axiom of comprehension for a given predicate takes the unrestricted form, but the predicates that may be used in the schema are themselves restricted. The predicate ( is not in ) is forbidden, because the same symbol  appears on both sides of the membership symbol (and so at different "relative types"); thus, Russell's paradox is avoided. However, by taking  to be , which is allowed, we can form a set of all sets. For details, see stratification.

References

 
Halmos, Paul, Naive Set Theory. Princeton, New Jersey: D. Van Nostrand Company, 1960. Reprinted by Springer-Verlag, New York, 1974.  (Springer-Verlag edition).
Jech, Thomas, 2003. Set Theory: The Third Millennium Edition, Revised and Expanded. Springer.  .
Kunen, Kenneth, 1980. Set Theory: An Introduction to Independence Proofs. Elsevier. .

Citations

Axioms of set theory